Daniel Robichaud (born 1976) is a Canadian entrepreneur and angel investor.

Early life and education
Robichaud first learned the principles of running a business by watching his parents operate the dry cleaning business founded in 1948 by his grandfather. He launched his own landscaping business at the age of 10 but received a letter from the lawyer of a local landscaping company accusing him of stealing clients and demanding that he stop doing business on the grounds that he had no valid tax number.

Robichaud graduated high school at Claretain College. In 1997, he earned a three-year college degree in Art & Technology of Media from Jonquiere College. In 1999, he completed Montreal's HEC University Business Management Program.

Career
Robichaud partnered with three established radio hosts to buy a radio station and became the station's 'morning man.'

In his early 20s, Robichaud relocated to Montreal and found work hosting three radio shows at different radio stations. He founded Radioactif.com in 2000 – featuring new initiatives including webcams, live chat, and podcasting. He then launched his own ISP in 2001. By 2003, according to Mediametrix stats, RadioActif.com was one of the top 15 most visited French websites in Canada and it remains the largest independent French Internet Service Provider nationally. Robichaud hosted the morning show from 5AM to 10AM.

Robichaud then became New Media Director at Corus Entertainment. His new job was creating online media portals. In 2006, Robichaud sold his web design company to the media division of a Fortune Global 500. His next start-up was StreamTheWorld, providing streaming technology and services to online broadcasters. Today, the company streams over 2000 radio and television stations in 25 countries. StreamTheWorld was sold in 2010 to a California company though the core team has remained in Montreal. Robichaud has also been involved in Mobilito, Têtes à Claques’ and Virtual Paper.

In 2008, Robichaud founded Neotech Capital. He has also invested in entrepreneurs as an angel investor and helped them build their own successful businesses. He is a Limited Partner in 6 VC funds and his venture PasswordBox was acquired by Intel in December 2014.

References

1976 births
Living people
Businesspeople from Quebec
Canadian radio personalities
People from Drummondville
Université de Montréal alumni